BenDeLaCreme (born September 24, 1981) is the stage persona of Benjamin H. Putnam, an American drag queen, burlesque performer, and actor based in Seattle, Washington. He is known for being a contestant on the sixth season of RuPaul's Drag Race and the third season of RuPaul's Drag Race: All Stars. He is also known for his solo shows   Ready To Be Committed, Terminally Delightful, Inferno A-Go-Go and Cosmos, and as co-creator and host of burlesque revues Freedom Fantasia and Homo for the Holidays.

Early life 
Putnam grew up in Litchfield, Connecticut, attending Litchfield High School. During his performance on Drag Race, Putnam revealed that he was bullied as a child for being overweight, "weird", and gay. His mother, who had been the positive voice to counteract this, died of cancer when he was 13 years old. Putnam was also open about his struggles with depression, revealing that his "terminally delightful" drag persona helped him overcome this.

Artistry 
Putnam's stage name is a play off the French term crème de la crème, which, translated, means "cream of the cream" or "best of the best", as well as a play off of his given first name. He commonly refers to himself as either "Ben" or "DeLa" to distinguish between the private, male persona (Ben) and public, female one (DeLa). He is also sometimes referred to as "Bendela", a take on the name Vendela. In an interview with Artes Magazine, he explained "I consider BenDeLaCreme to be the very best of Ben which is the name of the gentleman that I share a body with. DeLa is how I refer to the lady part of me. If you say Ben you're talking to that guy. If you say DeLa you are talking to me."

Putnam credits his interest in drag and burlesque to seeing Varla Jean Merman's Holiday Ham in Boston in 2001. He was inspired by Merman's theatrical, character-driven approach to drag performance. DeLa considers drag to be "an inherently political act", an opportunity to encourage people to think about complex issues related to gender and sexuality through humor and theatre. Her solo shows combine comedy, song, burlesque, dance, and video clips (often DeLa herself in other roles). DeLa's costume style is reminiscent of iconic 1950s pin-up girls. She cites dancer and actress Ann Miller as an early influence.

Career 

Putnam's career began in Chicago in 2002, while he was pursuing a BFA degree at the School of the Art Institute of Chicago from 2001 to 2003. Although his course of study focused on painting, he found himself more interested in performance art.

Her first opportunities to perform came at drag revues at Chicago-area gay bars. Early on, she was exposed to a more explicitly feminist, message-driven side of drag culture by the Chicago Kings, a drag king troupe with which she frequently performed as the token "queen". At the same time, DeLa made a conscious decision to present a more positive, cheerful persona during her shows, even when addressing serious subject matter such as prejudice, death, and depression.

Since the mid-2000s, she has been based in Seattle, Washington. She is the hostess for The Atomic Bombshells burlesque troupe and teaches at Seattle's Academy of Burlesque. DeLa has collaborated with many members of the Seattle burlesque community, including Drag Race Season 5 winner Jinkx Monsoon. She runs the theatrical production company DeLouRue Presents, creating and performing in popular holiday revue shows Freedom Fantasia and Homo for the Holidays, with burlesque duo Kitten La Rue and Lou Henry Hoover, her friends and frequent collaborators.

BenDeLaCreme's touring solo shows include Terminally Delightful, Cosmos, and Inferno A-Go-Go. She has also appeared in several films by filmmaker Wes Hurley including the documentary Waxie Moon, Waxie Moon in Fallen Jewel, and as a narrator of the series Capitol Hill.

At the 2019 MAC Awards, BenDeLaCreme was presented with an award in the category "Major Impersonation/Characterization/Drag Artist" for her show Inferno A-Go-Go.

In December 2020, BenDeLaCreme's collaboration film with Jinkx Monsoon, The Jinkx and Dela Holiday Special was released, and can be streamed on Hulu.

RuPaul's Drag Race
In 2014, BenDeLaCreme appeared in the sixth season of RuPaul's Drag Race, where she placed fifth and was voted Miss Congeniality by viewers. In 2018, she appeared in the third season of RuPaul's Drag Race: All Stars, where, after a record-breaking fifth challenge win in episode 6, she chose to eliminate herself, claiming she had already proven herself and that she felt the other remaining contestants wanted the crown more than she did. Many fans were shocked at this decision, as her track record heavily favored her to win the entire competition. DeLa is the only Drag Race contestant so far to win five challenges in a single season, win four episodes consecutively and, at the time, win the "Snatch Game" challenge on more than one season (later joined by season 7 and All Stars 6 contestant Ginger Minj, as well as Season 5 and All Stars 7 contestant Jinkx Monsoon), and currently still has the best statistics of any queen to have ever competed in Drag Race.

Filmography

Film

Television

Web series

Discography

As featured artist

Awards and nominations

See also
 LGBT culture in Seattle

References 

Living people
American drag queens
LGBT people from Washington (state)
Male actors from Seattle
RuPaul's Drag Race contestants
Place of birth missing (living people)
School of the Art Institute of Chicago alumni
RuPaul's Drag Race All Stars contestants
1981 births